Amroha Lok Sabha constituency is one of the 80 Lok Sabha (parliamentary) constituencies in Uttar Pradesh.

Assembly segments

At present Amroha Loksabha Constituency consists of following Assembly Constituencies :

Members of Parliament

Election results

General election 2019

General election 2014

See also
 Amroha district
 List of constituencies of the Lok Sabha

Notes

External links
Amroha lok sabha constituency election 2019 result details
Amroha Parliamentary Constituency Results
Amroha Lok Sabha

Lok Sabha constituencies in Uttar Pradesh
Amroha district